The term queer ecology refers to a perspective which views nature, biology, and sexuality through the lens of queer theory. It objects to what it considers heterosexist notions of nature, drawing from science studies, ecofeminism, environmental justice, and queer geography. This perspective breaks apart various "dualisms" that exist within human understanding of nature and culture.

Overview
Queer ecology states that people often regard nature in terms of dualistic notions like "natural and unnatural", "alive or not alive" or "human or not human", when in reality, nature exists in a continuous state. The idea of "natural" arises from human perspectives on nature, not "nature" itself.

Queer ecology rejects ideas of human exceptionalism and anthropocentrism that propose that humans are unique and more important than other non-human nature. Specifically, queer ecology challenges traditional ideas regarding which organisms, species, and individuals have value.

Queer ecology also states that heteronormative ideas (heteronormativity defined as society assigning privilege to heterosexual beings) saturate human understanding of "nature" and human society, and calls for the inclusion of queerness in environmental movements. It rejects the associations that exist between "natural" and "heterosexual", and draws attention to how both nature and marginalized social groups have been historically exploited.

People apply queer ecology by letting go of ideas of what is "natural", getting rid of generalizations of human and animal behavior, acknowledging the diversity of the natural world, and facilitating discourse centered around queerness. Through the lens of queer ecology, all living things are considered to be connected and interrelated.

"To queer" nature is to acknowledge the complexities present in nature and to rid interpretations of nature from human assumptions.

Definition 
"The term "queer ecology" refers to a loose, interdisciplinary constellation of practices that aim, in different ways, to disrupt prevailing heterosexist discursive and institutional articulations of sexuality and nature, and also to reimagine evolutionary processes, ecological interactions, and environmental politics in light of queer theory. Drawing from traditions as diverse as evolutionary biology, LGBTTIQQ2SA (lesbian, gay, bisexual, transgender, transsexual, intersex, queer, questioning, two-spirited, and asexual) movements, and queer geography and history, feminist science studies, ecofeminism, and environmental justice, queer ecology currently highlights the complexity of contemporary biopolitics, draws important connections between the material and cultural dimensions of environmental issues, and insists on an articulatory practice in which sex and nature are understood in light of multiple trajectories of power and matter"

History 
The theoretical beginnings of queer ecology are commonly traced back to what are considered foundational texts of queer theory. For example, scholar Catriona Sandilands cites queer ecology's origins back to Michel Foucault's The History of Sexuality (1976). Sandilands suggests Foucault "lays the groundwork for much contemporary queer ecological scholarship" by examining the conception of sex as "a specific object of scientific knowledge, organized through, on the one hand, a 'biology of reproduction' that considered human sexual behavior in relation to the physiologies of plant and animal reproduction, and on the other, a 'medicine of sex' that conceived of human sexuality in terms of desire and identity." Foucault explains the "medicine of sex" as a way of talking about human health separate from the "medicine of the body". Early notions of queer ecology also come from the poetry of Edward Carpenter, who addressed themes of sexuality and nature in his work.

Judith Butler's work regarding gender also laid an important foundation for queer ecology. Specifically, Butler explores gender as performativity in their 1990 book, Gender Trouble: Feminism and the Subversion of Identity. Queer ecology proposes that when Butler's notion of performtivity is applied to the realm of ecology, it dismantles the 'nature-culture binary. From the perspective of queer ecology, essential differences do not exist between "nature" and "culture". Rather, humans who have categorized "nature" and "culture" as distinct from one another perform these differences. From a scientific perspective, "nature" cannot be fully understood if animals or particles are considered to be distinct, stagnant entities; rather, nature exists as a "web" of interactions.

In part, queer ecology also emerged from ecofeminist work. Although queer ecology rejects traits of essentialism found in early ecofeminism, ecofeminist texts such as Mary Daly's Gyn/Ecology (1978) laid the foundation for understanding intersections between women and the environment. Queer ecology develops these intersectional understandings that began in the field of ecofeminism about the ways sex and nature have been historically been depicted. As a political theory that insists ecological and social problems are enmeshed, queer ecology has been compared to Murray Bookchin's concept of social ecology since both are political theories that insist that ecological and social problems are enmeshed.

In May 1994, an editorial essay in UnderCurrents: Journal of Critical Environmental Studies entitled "Queer Nature" introduced the notion of queer ecology. The piece identified the disruptive power possible when one examines normative categories associated with nature. The piece asserted that white heterosexual males hold power over the politics of nature, and this pattern cannot continue. Queer ecologist thinking and literature was also showcased in this issue in the form of poetry and art submissions—deconstructing heteronormativity within both human and environmental sexualities. Later in 2015, Undercurrents proceeded to release an update to their original issue and a podcast to celebrate 20 years of continued studies in queer ecology.

Recently, movies like James Cameron's Avatar have started to popularize ideas central to queer ecology.

Heterosexism and the environment 
Queer ecology recognizes that people often associate heterosexuality with the idea of "natural", in contrast to, for example, homosexuality, which people associate with "unnatural". These expectations of sexuality and nature often influence scientific studies of non-human wildlife. The natural world often defies the heteronormative notions held by scientists, helping humans to redefine our cultural understanding of what is "natural" and also how we "queer" environmental spaces. For example, in "The Feminist Plant: Changing Relations with the Water Lily", Prudence Gibson and Monica Gagliano explain how the water lily defies heterosexist notions. They argue that because the water lily is so much more than its reputation as a "pure" or "feminine" plant, we need to reevaluate our understandings of plants and acknowledge the connection between plant biology and models for cultural practice through a feminist lens.

Reimagining scientific perspectives 
In disciplines of the natural sciences like evolutionary biology and ecology, queer ecology allows scholars to reimagine cultural binaries that exist between "natural and unnatural" and "living and non-living".

Timothy Morton proposes that biology and ecology deconstruct notions of authenticity. Specifically, he proposes that life exists as a "mesh of interrelations" that blurs traditional scientific boundaries, like species, living and nonliving, human and nonhuman, and even between an organism and its environment. Queer ecology, according to Morton, emphasizes a perspective on life that transcends dualisms and distinctive boundaries, instead recognizing that unique relationships exist between life forms at different scales. Queer ecology nuances traditional evolutionary perspectives on sexuality, regarding heterosexuality as impractical at many scales and as a "late" evolutionary development.

Other scholars challenge the contrast that exists between "human" and "non-human" classifications, proposing that the idea of "fluidity" from queer theory should also extend to the relationship between humans and the environment.

Queer ecology and human society 
Queer ecology is also relevant when considering human geography. For example, Catriona Sandilands considers lesbian separatist communities in Oregon as a specific manifestation of queer ecology. Marginalized communities, according to Sandilands, create new cultures of nature against dominant ecological relations. Environmental issues are closely linked to social relations that include sexuality, and so a strong alliance exists between queer politics and environmental politics. "Queer geography" calls attention to the spatial organization of sexuality, which implicates issues of access to natural spaces, and the sexualization of these spaces. This implies that unique ecological relationships arise from these sexuality-based experiences. Furthermore, queer ecology disrupts the association of nature with sexuality. Matthew Gandy proposes that urban parks, for example, are heteronormative because they reflect hierarchies of property and ownership. "Queer", in the case of urban nature, refers to spatial difference and marginalization, beyond sexuality.

Queer ecology is also important within individual households. As a space influenced by society, the home is often an ecology that perpetuates heteronormativity. Will McKeithen examines queer ecology in the home by considering the implications of the label "crazy cat lady". Because the "crazy cat lady" often defies societal heterosexist expectations for the home, as she, instead of having a romantic, male, human partner, treats animals as legitimate companions. This rejection of heteropatriarchal norms and acceptance of multispecies intimacy makes the home into a queer ecology.

Queer ecology also works its way into feminist economics, which are centered at childcare and reproduction. Anti-capitalist feminists use queer ecology to disentangle the gender binary, including the ties between the female body's reproductive potential and the responsibility of social reproduction and childcare.

Arts and literature
Some have begun to apply the notion of queer ecology to their work in visual art, theater, and literature.

Theater is an important setting to explore ideas of queer ecology because theater provides an environment to consider a world independent of the constructed binaries and heteronormativity in the outside world. Thus, theater can construct temporary "queer ecologies" on the stage. Theater can portray a hypothetical society of radical coexistence by blurring the lines by challenging social binaries, "natural" hierarchies, and challenging the notion that the earth is a nonliving entity.

Fundamental notions of queer ecology are present in the writing of Henry David Thoreau, Herman Melville, Willa Cather, and Djuna Barnes. These writers complicate the common belief that environmental literature consists exclusively of heterosexual doctrine and each of their work sheds light on the ways that human sexuality is connected to environmental politics. Robert Azzarello, in addition, has identified common themes of queerness and environmental studies in American Romantic and post-Romantic literature that challenge conventional ideas of what is "natural".

See also 
Queer theory
Ecofeminism
Ecocriticism
Environmental humanities
Greta Gaard
Catriona Sandilands
Sexecology
Social ecology

References

External links 
Queer Ecology by Catriona Sandilands in Keywords for Environmental Studies
Institute of Queer Ecology

Queer theory
Environmentalism
Environmental movements
Environmental humanities
Environmental studies
Environmental social science concepts
Political ecology